Man of the West is a 1958 American Western film noir film starring Gary Cooper and directed by Anthony Mann, produced by Walter Mirisch and distributed by United Artists. The screenplay, written by Reginald Rose, is based on the 1955 novel The Border Jumpers, by Will C. Brown. Julie London, Lee J. Cobb, Jack Lord, and Arthur O'Connell co-star with John Dehner, Robert J. Wilke, and Royal Dano in supporting roles. The film is one of Cooper's final Westerns.

Former outlaw Link Jones (Cooper) travels from his small town to Crosscut Texas to catch a train to Fort Worth to hire the town's first schoolteacher. When his train stops for refuelling on the way, they are set upon by armed robbers but the train pulls away, leaving behind Jones, the fast-talking gambler Sam Beasley (O'Connell) and saloon singer Billie Ellis (London). They start walking and eventually reach a place that Link knows well: the farmhouse where he once lived. There he finds the men who robbed the train and their leader, his uncle, Dock Tobin (Cobb), who wants Link to return to his old criminal ways and rejoin the gang, which consists of some of Link's cousins. Link has no interest in doing so and has to find a way out for himself and his two companions, knowing the gang are untrustworthy killers.

The film premiered on October 1, 1958. At the time of release, the film was largely panned by American critics, but it was praised by Jean-Luc Godard, who, before he became a director, was a film critic. Godard claimed that Man of the West was the best film of the year. Decades after the film's release, it has gained a cult following and greater acclaim, with film historian Philip French claiming the film to be Anthony Mann's masterpiece, containing Cooper's finest performance.

Plot
Link Jones (Gary Cooper) rides into Crosscut, Texas to have a bite to eat, then catch a train to Fort Worth, where he intends to use the savings of his community of Good Hope to hire a schoolteacher.

On the train platform Sam Beasley (Arthur O'Connell) speaks briefly with Link,  rousing the suspicions of the town marshal, Sam being a known gambler and con man. When the lawman remarks that Link looks familiar, he gives a false name, Henry Wright.

Aboard the train Sam joins Link, learns of his mission in Fort Worth and claims he can be of help. Sam introduces him to the Crosscut saloon singer, Billie Ellis (Julie London), insisting she could make an ideal teacher.

Their conversation is overheard by Alcutt, a shady-looking passenger. When the train stops to pick up wood for additional fuel, male passengers help load it on to the train but Alcutt remains on board, feigning sleep. From a window he signals to three horsemen, Coaley Tobin (Jack Lord), Trout (Royal Dano) and Ponch (Robert J. Wilke), who attempt to rob the train. The armed guard on the train thwarts the attempt.

Link tries to intervene and is knocked unconscious. The train departs, with Alcutt riding off with Link's bag containing Good Hope's money. Alcutt is wounded as he and the three other robbers flee.

Link revives to discover that he, Sam and Billie have been left behind, many miles from the nearest town. Link leads them on foot to a ramshackle farm, admitting that he lived there years earlier. Link sends the others to wait in the barn, giving Billie his coat to wear. Link enters the rundown house and finds the train robbers hiding inside.

Coaley is suspicious of Link's claim that he simply wants to rest for the night. They are interrupted by ageing outlaw Dock Tobin (Lee J. Cobb), who is startled to see Link, his nephew, whom he raised to be a killer and a thief. More than a dozen years earlier, in order to go straight, Link abandoned Tobin, and the old man laments that nothing has been the same since.  He introduces Link to the others, including Link's cousin, Coaley.

Disturbed by the revelation of Link's true identity, Coaley demonstrates his toughness by shooting Alcutt, who is near death from his wound. Realising the danger of his situation, Link brings Sam and Billie in from the barn and lies to Tobin, telling him that Billie is his woman and also that he purposely set out to find Dock after being left behind by the train.

Tobin reveals his long-held ambition to rob the bank in the town of Lassoo and asserts that Link's return to the gang makes that possible and will breathe new life into them all. To protect the lives of his companions Link agrees to participate in the holdup. After Link and Sam are sent outside to dig a grave and bury Alcutt, an increasingly drunken Coaley decides to force Billie to strip. Her cries alert Link and, when he returns to the cabin, Coaley holds a knife to his throat while continuing to demand Billie remove her clothes.

When she is nearly undressed, Tobin steps in and ends the situation. He tells everyone to go to sleep and sends Link and Billie to sleep in the barn.

Claude Tobin (John Dehner), another cousin, arrives the next morning and is displeased at finding Link there. Tobin rejects the suggestion of Claude and Coaley that it would be best to kill Link and the others. They all depart on the four-day trip to Lassoo in three wagons and two on horseback.

When they make camp on the trail, Link seeks revenge for the brutal treatment of Billie at the ranch and goads the brutal Coaley into a fistfight. Link beats his cousin severely, then forcibly strips him of his clothes as revenge for forcing Billie to strip at the barn. Deeply humiliated, Coaley attempts to shoot the unarmed Link, but Sam interferes and is shot instead. Tobin then shoots Coaley for disobeying him.

During the trip Billie bemoans the fact that Link is a man worth loving but that she cannot have him. He says he has a wife and two children in Good Hope.

With the town of Lassoo in sight, Link volunteers to go in and do the holdup job, secretly hoping that in town he can seek help. Tobin insists that he be accompanied by the mute Trout. It turns out that Lassoo is a ghost town, its bank deserted except for a frightened Mexican woman who has the two at gunpoint when Trout coldly shoots her. Link uses the woman’s gun to kill Trout. He then awaits the arrival of Claude and Ponch. In a drawn-out gun battle, Link kills Ponch first, then eventually and with some regret - because as children the two of them had been fairly close - Claude.

Returning to camp, Link discovers to his horror that Billie has been raped and beaten. He goes in search of Tobin, who is on a cliff nearby. Link calls out to his uncle that he, like Lassoo, is a ghost and is finished. Tobin starts ranting and firing his gun, and Link finally shoots him and reclaims the bag of Good Hope's money.

Riding back to civilisation, Billie tells Link she loves him but, knowing that he intends to return to his home and his family, she is resigned to the fact that she must resume her singing career and proceed alone.

Cast

 Gary Cooper as Link Jones
 Julie London as Billie Ellis
 Lee J. Cobb as Dock Tobin
 Arthur O'Connell as Sam Beasley
 Jack Lord as Coaley
 Royal Dano as Trout
 John Dehner as Claude
 Robert J. Wilke as Ponch
 J. Williams as Alcutt
 Emory Parnell as Henry
 Chief Tahachee as Pio

 Frank Ferguson• as Crosscut Marshal (uncredited)
 Tom London as Tom (uncredited)

The film reunited Gary Cooper and Robert J. Wilke, who were adversaries in High Noon.

Production

Development
The script of the film, which was written by Reginald Rose (best known for writing 12 Angry Men (1957)), was based on the 1955 novel The Border Jumpers by Will C. Brown. The title of the film had nothing to do with the novel entitled Man of the West, which was written by screenwriter Philip Yordan. Yordan's novel had been adapted into a film called Gun Glory, which starred Stewart Granger in the lead role. The producer of the film, Walter Mirisch (whose company produced the Academy Award-nominated films: The Magnificent Seven (1960), West Side Story (1961), The Great Escape (1963) and In the Heat of the Night (1967)), assigned director Anthony Mann to direct an adaptation of the novel.

Casting
Stewart Granger was originally considered for the lead role. James Stewart, who had worked with director Anthony Mann in eight movies, five of them westerns: Winchester '73 (1950), Bend of the River (1952), The Naked Spur (1953), The Far Country (1954) and The Man from Laramie (1955), eagerly wanted the role. Supposedly, Stewart was extremely upset when Mann didn't give him the script for the film, felt betrayed, and had no interest in working with him ever again, although Mann thought that Stewart would be unfit for the role. Another probable reason why Mann didn't give Stewart the script was that Mann and Stewart had a falling out during the shooting of Night Passage (1957). While Mann and Stewart felt that the script of the film needed some rewrites, Mann wanted a darker edge for the main character of the film and dropped out because Stewart softened up the character and sang a few songs in the final film, as a showcase for his own accordion playing. With Mann out of the picture, James Neilson took over his position as director of Night Passage. For Man of the West, Gary Cooper was eventually cast in the lead role of Link Jones, a former outlaw who is forced to relive his past. This was Cooper's first true Western since 1954's Vera Cruz with Burt Lancaster. He initially felt that he was miscast in the role of the former outlaw because he was twenty years older than the character; Cooper was 56 at the time of filming, the lead character being 36. However, in an interview at the 2008 Cinecon in Hollywood, Mirisch claimed that having just wrapped Love in the Afternoon, he promptly signed Cooper for another picture, which ended up being this one. He stated that they hadn't even considered a director yet, so Stewart was never a factor.

According to biographer Jeffrey Meyers, Cooper, who struggled with moral conflicts in his personal life, "understood the anguish of a character striving to retain his integrity ... [and] brought authentic feeling to the role of a tempted and tormented, yet essentially decent man."

Lee J. Cobb (who had starred in 12 Angry Men as one of the twelve jurors) played the role of Dock Tobin, the uncle of Link, who wants his nephew to return to his old ways and rejoin his gang. Despite playing the uncle of the main character, Cobb was ten years younger than Cooper. Make-up was applied in an attempt to make Cobb look older than Cooper. The main villain of the film, Tobin wants his nephew to return to his old ways and rejoin his gang. The age difference was also obvious with John Dehner, who played a key role as Link's cousin and childhood friend, Claude. Dehner was fourteen years younger than Cooper and it was readily apparent.

Arthur O'Connell played Sam Beasley, a fast-talking gambler, and saloon singer Billie Ellis was played by Julie London. London said this was her favorite movie. Tobin's henchmen Coaley, Trout and Ponch (who rob the train) were played by Jack Lord, Royal Dano and Robert J. Wilke respectively. J. Williams played Alcutt, one of the passengers on the train, and Chief Tahachee was cast as Pio.

Joe Dominguez, Dick Elliott, Frank Ferguson, Herman and Signe Hack, Anne Kunde, Tom London, Tina Menard, Emory Parnell, John Wayne's stuntmen Chuck Roberson, Glen Walters and Glen Wilkerson play minor roles in the film and are uncredited.

Filming
Principal photography of Man of the West started and ended in 1958, with a budget of $1.5 million. The film was shot on the widescreen CinemaScope process (which was introduced in 1953) by cinematographer Ernest Haller, who is best known for his Academy Award-winning work in Gone with the Wind.

Although the film takes place in Texas, most of the film was shot in California. The train scenes were shot on the Sierra Railroad in Jamestown, California. The Red Rock Canyon State Park, Santa Clarita, Thousand Oaks, Newhall and the Mojave Desert all served as filming locations for the film. Two ranches located on Newhall and Thousand Oaks respectively were used as sets which were designed by art director Hilyard M. Brown, best known for his work in Cleopatra  (for which he won an Academy Award for Best Art Direction), Creature from the Black Lagoon and The Night of the Hunter.

Gary Cooper did his own horse-riding scenes despite physical pain that he suffered from a car accident years earlier. Chuck Roberson, Jack Williams and Jack N. Young were the stunt performers for the film.

During a snow storm, Mann observed Cooper's eyes, which fascinated him: "It's all in the eyes. The heroes, all the stars the public loves, have very light blue eyes or green eyes....The eyes reflect the inner flame that animates the heroes. The guys with dark eyes play supporting roles or become character actors."

Themes
Canadian film critic Robin Wood noted that Man of the West is director Anthony Mann's version of William Shakespeare's play King Lear, whose elements appeared in The Furies with Walter Huston, The Naked Spur and The Man From Laramie, with its sense of emotional whirlwind, and an older order crumbling. Man of the West, like most Mann films, is a tale of redemption. We are asked to consider the essential monstrousness of the hero, and whether redemption is a tenable idea. The noble frontiersman is made the Other, and one not very deserving of sympathy, a savage whose past ghoulishness seems unimaginable. Wood also noted that the film looks down the road to the contemporary horror film: The Texas Chainsaw Massacre (Tobe Hooper, 1974) and The Hills Have Eyes (Wes Craven, 1977), with their savage clans and desiccated American wasteland.

Reception
When first released, the film was largely ignored by American critics, though renowned French critic Jean-Luc Godard regarded it as the best film released that year. Howard Thompson, in The New York Times, gave it one of the few raves in the mainstream press. In the decades since the film's release, it has garnered a cult following as well as considerably greater acclaim. Some, such as The Guardian'''s Derek Malcolm consider the film Mann's best and a landmark in the western genre's canon. Malcolm included the film in his 2000 list The Century of Film. Critic and film historian Philip French cites Man of the West as Anthony Mann's masterpiece, containing Gary Cooper's greatest performance. Man of the West maintains a 94% approval rating on the Rotten Tomatoes film website, based on reviews from 17 critics.

"Morally objectionable"
The trade publication Motion Picture Daily reported in 1958 that the National Legion of Decency objected to the content of Man of the West''. In its October 3 issue, just two days after the film's release, the daily magazine provides a few examples of the Legion's classification system for judging a Hollywood production's level of "decency":

References

See also
 List of American films of 1958

External links

 
 
 
 
 Trailer for Man of the West at Internet Archive

1958 films
1950s English-language films
United Artists films
CinemaScope films
Films based on American novels
Films based on Western (genre) novels
Films directed by Anthony Mann
Films produced by Walter Mirisch
Films set in ghost towns
American Western (genre) films
1958 Western (genre) films
Films with screenplays by Reginald Rose
Films scored by Leigh Harline
Films shot in California
Films shot in the Mojave Desert
Color film noir
Revisionist Western (genre) films
1950s American films